Quercus kiukiangensis is an uncommon Asian species of trees in the beech Fagaceae. It has only been found in Tibet and Yunnan. It is placed in subgenus Cerris, section Cyclobalanopsis.Quercus kiukiangensis'' is a large tree up to 30 meters tall. Leaves can be as much as 18 cm long.

References

External links
line drawing, Flora of China Illustrations vol. 4, fig. 375, drawings 5-8 at top and center

kiukiangensis
Flora of Tibet
Flora of Yunnan
Trees of China
Plants described in 1976